The .400 Whelen cartridge was developed by Colonel Townsend Whelen while he was commanding officer of Frankford Arsenal in the early 1920s.  The cartridge resembles a .30-06 Springfield case necked up to .40 caliber to accept bullets manufactured for the .405 Winchester.

Design
Colonel Whelen asserted the very small remaining portion of the .30-06's 17° 30 angled shoulder was likely to cause potentially dangerous headspace difficulties. The headspace issue has been widely discussed. Frankford Arsenal machine shop foreman James Howe necked down cylindrical brass available in the arsenal manufacturing process to form cartridges with a  shoulder to fit the chamber of his rifles.

Quality Cartridge has manufactured unformed, cylindrical empty brass cases headstamped for this cartridge.

Performance

See also
 List of rifle cartridges
 .30-06 descendants

References

External links 

Pistol and rifle cartridges